Sam and Mark's Guide to Dodging Disaster is a children's television programme shown on CBBC. The programme features Sam and Mark in non-speaking roles, with Hugh Dennis providing a voice-over. The programme is filmed using chroma key techniques.

Sam and Mark's Guide to Dodging Disaster focuses around four or five disasters or situations, e.g. angry baboons or a volcanic eruption, and aims to present them in an amusing way. It gives a few tips on what to do. Sam and Mark transport about on a red sofa, often against their will, and are increasingly misled into what will happen. A number of sound effects are used for humour, such as the screams of a girl.
The series was directed by Duncan Chard and written by Patrick Makin.

External links 

BBC children's television shows
2000s British television series